Progabide (INN; trade name Gabrene, Sanofi-Aventis) is an analogue and prodrug of γ-aminobutyric acid (GABA) used in the treatment of epilepsy. Via conversion into GABA, progabide behaves as an agonist of the GABAA, GABAB, and GABAA-ρ receptors.

Uses
Progabide is approved in France for either monotherapy or adjunctive use in the treatment of epilepsy—specifically, generalized tonic-clonic, myoclonic, partial, and Lennox-Gastaut syndrome seizures—in both children and adults.

Progabide has been investigated for many diseases besides epilepsy, including Parkinson's disease, schizophrenia, clinical depression, anxiety disorder and spasticity with various levels of success.

In 1987, Bartolini and colleagues reported progabide's actions on dopamine to be contradictory, decreasing dopamine release, dopamine receptor density and postsynaptic receptor responsivity to dopamine while reducing striatal cholinergic activity so as to increase dopaminergic effects. Bartholini and colleagues concluded that it was this that caused Parkinson's patients in human clinical trials to either see an improvement in their Parkinson's with a worsening of L-dopa dyskinesia or an improvement in dyskinesia but with sometimes aggravated Parkinson's symptoms. The cholinergic effect takes only a single injection to achieve in rats; when given with haloperidol, the development of tolerance to haloperidol's cataleptic effects did not develop. It was hoped that this would be effective for tardive dyskinesia. However, Soares, Rathbone and Deeks wrote in the 2004 issue of The Cochrane Database of Systematic Reviews that "Any possible benefits are likely to be outweighed by the adverse effects associated with their [GABAergic agents'] use."

In addition to being tested for antipsychotic-induced tardive dyskinesia, progabide was itself tested as an antipsychotic; as early as 1979, it was obvious that it was ineffective for psychosis. While progabide may have been devoid of antipsychotic effects, it did have the effect in schizoaffective and hebephrenic patients of improving environmental responsiveness and social interactions.

Synthesis

See also 
 Progabide acid (SL-75102), an active metabolite of progabide
 Tolgabide

References 

Anticonvulsants
Chlorobenzenes
GABA analogues
GABAA receptor agonists
GABAA-rho receptor agonists
GABAB receptor agonists
Fluoroarenes
Phenols
Imines